is the highest-ranking official artistic organization in Japan. It is established as an extraordinary organ of the Japanese Agency for Cultural Affairs (文化庁, Bunkacho) in the thirty-first article of the law establishing the Ministry of Education, Culture, Sports, Science and Technology. The Academy discusses art-related issues, advises the Minister of Education, Culture, Sports, Science and Technology on art-related issues, and promotes arts in three categories: 1) fine art, 2) literary arts, 3) music, drama, and dance. It is closely associated with the annual Japan Art Academy Exhibition (Nitten), the premier art exhibition in Japan; the Japan Art Academy originally ran the Nitten but since 1958 the exhibition is run by a separate private institution. The Japan Art Academy headquarters is in Ueno Park, Tokyo.

The Japan Art Academy should not be confused with the Japan Art Institute, which is a completely different organization.

History
The Japan Art Academy was founded in 1907 as the Fine Arts Reviewing Committee (Bijutsu Shinsa Iinkai) of the Ministry of Education. It was intended to provide quality standards and a venue for art exhibitions in late Meiji period Japan. The first of the organization's annual exhibitions, called the Bunten, was held in 1907. In 1919 the Imperial Fine Arts Academy (Teikoku Bijutsu-in) was established by imperial decree, first headed by Mori Ōgai. Upon establishment of the Imperial Arts Academy, the Fine Arts Reviewing Committee was discontinued and assimilated into the new organization, with the Bunten exhibition accordingly renamed the Teiten.

After a number of structural changes were made to the organization in response to criticism of its relevance and politics, it was eventually reorganized into the Imperial Art Academy (帝国芸術院, Teikoku Geijutsuin) in 1937, and the annual exhibition was renamed the Shinbunten. After the end of World War II, the dissolution of the Empire of Japan, and the start of the American occupation of Japan, the Imperial Art Academy was restructured as the Japan Art Academy (日本芸術院, Nihon Geijutsuin). Its annual exhibition was renamed the  starting from the 1946 editions (spring and fall, to make up for the lack of an exhibition in 1945), abbreviated as Nitten (日展).

In 1958, there was further re-organization whereby the Japan Fine Arts Academy became a solely academic and consultative body, and the organization of the Nitten annual exhibition was handled by a separate private company, the non-profit corporation Nitten (社団法人日展, Shadan Hōjin Nitten).

Membership
The Japan Art Academy is under the Ministry of Education, Culture, Sports, Science and Technology. It consists of a maximum of 120 members, who are appointed for life.

Membership is divided into the following categories

A. Fine Arts
 Nihonga
 Yōga
 Sculpture
 Crafts
 Calligraphy
 Architecture
B. Literary Arts
 Novels, prose literature
 Poetry
 Essays, translation
C. Music, Drama, and Dance
 Nōgaku
 Kabuki
 Bunraku
 Traditional music
 Western music
 Dance
 Drama(includes cinema)

List of leaders
Mori Ōgai (1919–1922)
Kuroda Seiki (1922–1924)
 (1924–1931)
 (1931–1935)
 (1937–1947)
 (1948–1979)
 (1979–1990)
 (1990–2004)
Shumon Miura (2004–2014)
Kuroi Senji (2014–2020)
 (2020–present)

Nitten

The  claims to be the largest combined art exhibition of its kind in the world, attracting a great number of fans and art critics. The exhibition consists five art categories: Nihonga and Western Style Painting, Sculpture, Crafts and Calligraphy. During each exhibition, works of the great masters are shown alongside works of the new but talented artists.

For ninety-nine years the exhibition (under its various names) was held at the Tokyo Metropolitan Art Museum (東京都美術館, Tōkyō-to Bijutsukan) in Ueno, but from the hundredth year in 2007 the exhibition venue was changed to the National Art Center Tokyo (国立新美術館, Kokuritsu Shin-bijutsukan) in Roppongi.

The Japan Fine Arts Exhibition decided not to award any of the top prizes in any of the 5 sections for 2013, following the revelation of fraudulent judging in the calligraphy section of the fiscal 2009 show. It was the first time since 1958, when the organization became a nonprofit corporation, that none of the prizes were awarded.

References

External links
Home page 
Home page of the Nitten

.
 
Organizations based in Tokyo
Ueno Park
Arts in Japan
Art Academy
Arts organizations established in 1907
1907 establishments in Japan